TransDiv is the authorized abbreviation or acronym used by the U.S. Navy during World War II for "transport division." The commander of a transport division was known as ComTransDiv (followed by the number of the division).

References

 OPNAV 29-P1000

Seagoing divisions of the United States Navy